The Arch of Arcadius, Honorius and Theodosius (Latin: Arcus Arcadii Honorii et Theodosii) was an ancient triumphal arch in ancient Rome.

It was built by the senate in 405 AD after Stilicho's victory in the Battle of Pollentia three years earlier. As per tradition, the victory over the Goths was ascribed to the reigning emperors: Arcadius, Honorius and Theodosius II.

It survived until the 15th century, although by then it had been stripped of its marble facing.

See also
List of Roman triumphal arches
List of ancient monuments in Rome

External links
http://penelope.uchicago.edu/Thayer/E/Gazetteer/Places/Europe/Italy/Lazio/Roma/Rome/_Texts/PLATOP*/arcus.html#Arcadii_et_al
http://www.maquettes-historiques.net/P22bf.html

Buildings and structures completed in the 5th century
Ancient Roman triumphal arches in Rome